Credenhill is a village and civil parish in Herefordshire, England. The population of this civil parish taken at the 2011 Census was 2,271.

Near Credenhill is the site of the former Royal Air Force station, RAF Credenhill. It was redeveloped by the British Army for new headquarters for the 22 Special Air Service Regiment, who moved in 1999. The following year, the base was designated as Stirling Lines.

History

Credenhill village has had military connections since 80 BC, when Iron Age Celts constructed a hill fort and earthwork defence system commanding the surrounding area.  The Romans founded the town of Magnis at what is now Kenchester, which was later abandoned during the withdrawal of Roman armies from Britain.  In 428 AD Magnis was destroyed by a fire during raids by the Picts and Scots.  The remains of the old fort was occupied by the Saxons in 480 AD. The Saxon chief Creoda occupied the fort in 540 AD, and "Creoda's Hill" gave its name to Credenhill.

During the First World War, land in Credenhill was occupied by an army unit to store ammunition. In 1939 the land was requisitioned for defence and became RAF Hereford.

The 12th-century church of St Mary is a grade I listed building.

Governance
An electoral ward of the same name exists. This ward stretches south to Breinton with a total ward population as at the 2011 Census of 3,612.

Surrounding area 
There is an Iron Age hill fort half a mile north of Credenhill. Archaeological finds are in Hereford Museum. The defences of this very large hill fort follow the 600 ft contour and enclose nearly 50 acres (200,000 m²). They comprise an embankment and ditch with a slight counter-scarp bank. There are traces of a quarry ditch inside the main rampart around most of the circuit. Original in-turned entrances are at the centre of the east side and at the south-east corner, each approached by a hollow way cut deeply into the hillside.

Trial excavation has shown that the internal quarry-ditch is 5–10 ft deep. Its gradual in-filling was found to include various occupation layers associated with rectangular wooden buildings with four corner posts, measuring about 12 x , which had been rebuilt several times in the same place. There were also storage pits and other remains of occupation including pottery with stamped and incised patterns typical of the West Midlands Iron Age. Date, c. 400 BC; occupied continuously until about 75 AD. The fort and the surrounding ancient woodland are now part of the Woodland Trust.

Notable residents
Credenhill has links to cider production, one of Herefordshire's key industries. In 1887 Percy Bulmer founded the Bulmers cider company. The then 20-year-old son of the Reverend Charles Bulmer (rector of Credenhill) used apples from the rectory garden for the company's first produce.
Thomas Traherne, the 17th-century English poet and religious writer, was rector of Credenhill for ten years.

Climate
The frostiest month is February, with an average of 10.5 days recording a temperature below . There are no air frosts in meteorological summer. The whole year averages about 49.3 days with an air frost. It is calmest in July, when the average wind speed at 10 m is just .

References

External links 

Woodland Trust for Credenhill Park Wood
Credenhill Hillfort at PastScape
Credenhill Camp Monument Detail

Villages in Herefordshire
Hill forts in Herefordshire